Jennifer Teresia Salesa (née Latu, born 1968) is a New Zealand politician and member of the Labour Party who has served as a Member of Parliament since 2014. She was first elected as MP for Manukau East, and after its abolition in 2020 won the replacement electorate of Panmure-Ōtāhuhu. She served as a Cabinet Minister in the Sixth Labour Government as Minister for Building and Construction, Minister of Customs (from 2019) and Minister for Ethnic Communities from 2017 until 6 November 2020.

Biography

Early life and career
She is of Tongan heritage and is married to university academic Damon Salesa. Prior to entering Parliament Salesa had worked in the public sector, and overseas in the United States.

Political career

Salesa replaced long serving MP Ross Robertson in the Manukau East seat when he retired at the  election. She was successful in gaining the Labour party nomination for the seat, ahead of Auckland Councillor Efeso Collins. Salesa won the seat with 68.0% of the vote and a large majority amounting to 50.9%.

In mid-October 2017, Salesa was elected as a Cabinet Minister by the Labour Party caucus following Labour's formation of a government with New Zealand First and the Greens. She was appointed Minister for Building and Construction and Minister of Ethnic Communities, and Associate Minister of Education, Health, and Housing and Urban Development.

At the 9th New Zealand Youth Parliament, Salesa's Youth MP, Shaneel Lal founded the movement to end gay and gender conversion therapy in New Zealand.

In late June 2019, Salesa was made Minister of Customs following a cabinet reshuffle, replacing Kris Faafoi who assumed the portfolio of Associate Minister for public housing.

During the 2020 New Zealand general election, Salesa contested the Panmure-Ōtāhuhu electorate, defeating National Party candidate Kanwaljit Singh Bakshi by a final margin of 18,626 votes.

When the new Cabinet was announced following the election, Salesa lost all her ministerial positions. She was instead nominated for the role of Assistant Speaker. On 9 November 2020, Salesa was granted retention of the title "The Honourable" for life, in recognition of her term as a member of the Executive Council. She was officially appointed an Assistant Speaker on 26 November.

References

|-

|-

|-

|-

1960s births
Living people
New Zealand Labour Party MPs
Women members of the New Zealand House of Representatives
Members of the New Zealand House of Representatives
New Zealand MPs for Auckland electorates
Tongan emigrants to New Zealand
21st-century New Zealand politicians
21st-century New Zealand women politicians
Candidates in the 2017 New Zealand general election
Members of the Cabinet of New Zealand
Women government ministers of New Zealand
Year of birth missing (living people)
Candidates in the 2020 New Zealand general election
Women legislative deputy speakers